José Luis Calva (June 20, 1969 – December 11, 2007) was a Mexican writer and possible serial killer. He was charged with murdering and eating his girlfriend in 2007, to which he confessed before killing himself pre-trial, and was suspected in two to eight other murders.

Biography

Early life 
Calva's childhood was traumatic. His father died when he was two, and his mother used to bring men to his home whom the boy had to call "dad". When he was seven, he was raped by a 16-year-old friend of his older brother.

He met the woman who would become his wife and mother of two of his children, Aide, in 1996. They divorced and she moved to the United States with their daughters. He sank into a deep depression.

Arrest 
In October 2007, forces of the Federal Preventive Police went to Calva's home to arrest him under the suspicion that he was responsible for the disappearance of his girlfriend Alejandra Galeana, who was last seen on October 6. He was found eating a dish of human meat seasoned with lemon. He tried to escape by jumping through the window, severely injuring himself, but was captured.

Inside his flat, the police found the mutilated body of his girlfriend, human meat in the refrigerator, a frying pan with cooked human flesh and human bones in a box of cereal. Aside from that, an unfinished book titled Instintos Caníbales o 12 días (Cannibal Instincts or 12 days) and a picture of Anthony Hopkins portraying Hannibal Lecter was also found.

Death 
On the early morning of December 11, 2007, Calva, who apparently had committed suicide between 6:00am and 6:30am, was found hanging by his belt from the roof of his holding cell. No suicide note was found.

See also
List of serial killers by country

References

Further reading 
 Full coverage on El Universal

1969 births
2007 suicides
Mexican cannibals
Mexican male writers
Mexican people who died in prison custody
Prisoners who died in Mexican detention
Suicides by hanging in Mexico
Suspected serial killers
Violence against women in Mexico
Writers from Mexico City